25 Cancri is a common proper motion star system in the zodiac constellation of Cancer, located around 148 light-years away from the Sun. It has the Bayer designation d2 Cancri (d2 Cnc); 25 Cancri (25 Cnc) is the Flamsteed designation. It is near the lower limit of visibility to the naked eye in good viewing conditions, appearing as a dim, yellow-white-hued star with a combined apparent visual magnitude of 6.11. It is moving further from the Earth with a heliocentric radial velocity of +38 km/s.

Based upon a stellar classification of F6 V, the brighter component is an F-type main-sequence star that is generating energy through hydrogen fusion at its core. Cowley (1976) listed a class of F5 IIIm?, which suggests it may be an Am star. However, this has not been confirmed. It is about 2.5 billion years old with 1.51 times the mass of the Sun.

The companion is 4.19 magnitudes fainter than the primary, and lies at an angular separation of  along a position angle of 310°, as of 2013.

References

F-type main-sequence stars
Am stars
Double stars
High-proper-motion stars
Cancer (constellation)
Cancri, d2
BD+17 1842
Cancri, 25
71030
041319
3299